Frank Potter may refer to:
 Frank Potter (aviator)
 Frank Potter (politician)
 Frank J. Potter, British architect